This is a list of Scottish football transfers for the 2008–09 season. Only moves featuring at least one 2008–09 Scottish Premier League club or one 2008–09 Scottish First Division club are listed.

May 2008 – December 2008

January 2009 – April 2009

References

Scottish
Transfers
2008
Scotland